In civil engineering, a cut or cutting is where soil or rock from a relative rise along a route is removed. The term is also used in river management to speed a waterway's flow by short-cutting a meander.

Cuts are typically used in road, rail, and canal construction to reduce the length and grade of a route. Cut and fill construction uses the spoils from cuts to fill in defiles to cost-effectively create relatively straight routes at steady grades.

Cuts are used as alternatives to indirect routes, embankments, or viaducts.  They also have the advantage of comparatively lower noise pollution than elevated or at-grade solutions.

History

The term cutting appears in the 19th century literature to designate rock cuts developed to moderate grades of railway lines.  Railway Age's Comprehensive Railroad Dictionary defines a cut as "a passage cut for the roadway through an obstacle of rock or dirt."

Creation

Cuts can be created by multiple passes of a shovel, grader, scraper or excavator, or by blasting. One unusual means of creating a cut is to remove the roof of a tunnel through daylighting. Material removed from cuts is ideally balanced by material needed for fills along the same route, but this is not always the case when cut material is unsuitable for use as fill.

The word is also used in the same sense in mining, in particular Open-pit mining. The use of cuttings often provides byproducts as a form of mineral extraction, commonly sand, clay or gravel; the cost of building drains, reinforcing banks against landslide and a high water table are factors which commonly limit its use in certain areas.

Types of cut
There are at least two types of cut, sidehill cut and through cut. The former permits passage of a transportation route alongside of, or around a hill, where the slope is transverse to the roadway or the railway. A sidehill cut can be formed by means of sidecasting, i.e.,  cutting on the high side balanced by moving the material to build up the low side to achieve a flat surface for the route. In contrast, through cuts, where the adjacent grade is higher on both sides of the route, require removal of material from the area since it cannot be dumped alongside the route.

A ledge is a cut in the side of a cliff well above the bottom of a gorge.

Lock cut 

A lock cut is a section of a river or other inland waterway immediately upstream and downstream of a lock which has been modified to provide locations for boats to moor while waiting for the lock gates to open or to allow people to board or alight vessels.

Notable cuts

Canal
 Culebra Cut (Gaillard Cut) on the Panama Canal
 Dawesville Cut
 Corinth Canal

Rail

Asia
 Hellfire Pass, Thailand

Americas
 Bergen Hill Cut and Bergen Arches, New Jersey
 Duffy's Cut, Pennsylvania

Australia
 Windmill Hill Cutting, Western Australia
Big Hill Cutting, New South Wales

Europe
Archaeological site of Atapuerca, Spain

 Olive Mount cutting, Liverpool, England
 Talerddig cutting, Wales

Road
 Sideling Hill Cut on I-68
 Pikeville Cut-Through on U.S. Route 23 in Kentucky

See also
 Cut-and-cover
 Dashrath Manjhi
 Embankment (transportation)
 Flying arch, use of a dummy arch bridge to stabilise cutting walls against landslip (landslide)
 Trench

References

 
Construction
Rail infrastructure
Road cuttings
Building engineering